Aleksandr Aleksandrovich Volkov (born 27 May 1948) is a retired Russian cosmonaut. He is a veteran of 3 space flights, including twice to the Mir Soviet space station, and is the father of cosmonaut Sergey Volkov.

Biography and career
Volkov was born in Ukrainian SSR in a family of Russian ethnicity. At the age of 13, Volkov witnessed Yuri Gagarin become the first man in space and this inspired him to become a cosmonaut. He joined the Soviet space programme and became a test pilot before realising his dream.

He flew into space three times. His first spaceflight was a trip to Salyut 7 in 1985 (64 days in space), followed by two flights to the Mir space station, in 1988–1989 (151 days) and again in 1991–1992 (175 days) as commander of flight Soyuz TM-13. On board the Mir space station, he controlled the docking procedures among other things.

The Soviet Union broke up in 1991 during his second stay on board Mir. At the time Volkov was orbiting Earth on Mir with Sergei K. Krikalev, "the last citizens of the USSR". Having gone into orbit as Soviet citizens, they returned to Earth as Russian citizens.

He worked as Commander of the Cosmonaut Team at the Cosmonauts Training Centre from January 1991 until August 1998. His work was to prepare Russian and foreign cosmonauts for future flights to space stations to Mir and the International Space Station.

He is the father of Sergey Volkov. The younger Volkov became the first second-generation cosmonaut when he was launched aboard Soyuz TMA-12 on 8 April 2008, his first of three flights; in total he spent over a year aboard the International Space Station.

Awards
Aleksandr Volkov was awarded:
 Hero of the Soviet Union (1985)
 Order of Lenin (1985)
 Order of the October Revolution (1989)
 Order of Friendship of Peoples (1992)
 Medal 2nd class of the Order of Merit for the Fatherland (1996)
 Medal "For Merit in Space Exploration" (2011)
 Officer of the Legion of Honour (France)
 Order of Merit 3rd class (Ukraine, 2011)

References

External links

1948 births
Living people
People from Horlivka
Soviet cosmonauts
Russian cosmonauts
Heroes of the Soviet Union
Recipients of the Order of Lenin
Recipients of the Order of Friendship of Peoples
Recipients of the Order "For Merit to the Fatherland", 2nd class
Recipients of the Order of Merit (Ukraine), 3rd class
Officiers of the Légion d'honneur
Recipients of the Medal "For Merit in Space Exploration"
Salyut program cosmonauts
Spacewalkers
Mir crew members